Astragalus lentiginosus is a species of legume native to western North America where it grows in a range of habitats. Common names include spotted locoweed and freckled milkvetch. There are a great number of wild varieties. The flower and the fruit of an individual plant are generally needed to identify the specific variety.

Distribution

As a species, Astragalus lentiginosus is distributed throughout the Great Basin of North America, west from the Rocky Mountains to the California Coast Ranges, south to Mexico, and north to British Columbia.  Varieties are largely limited to marginal habitats such as disturbed sites in the arid regions of the continent.  The group also contains a number of edaphic specialists which occur at desert seeps, which frequently exhibit high levels of calcium carbonate.

Description

The plant is prostrate to erect in form and quite woolly to nearly hairless. The inflorescence holds up to 50 pea-like flowers which may be purplish or whitish or a mix of both. A unifying character among most of the varieties is an inflated, beaked legume pod with a groove along the side. The pod dries to a papery texture and dehisces starting at the beak to release the seeds. The epithet lentiginosus refers to the red mottling commonly found on the pods which resemble freckles.

Taxonomy

Many of what we currently know as varieties of Astragalus lentiginosus were originally described as individual species. Botanist Marcus E. Jones was the first to recognize the similarities among these taxa and arranged them as varieties of one species. Per Axel Rydberg employed a very different species concept stating that he did not believe in infrataxa  This resulted in his raising Jones's varieties to species in the genera Cystium and Tium. A notable novelty of Rydberg's treatment is the concept of sections which have been maintained in the keys of subsequent treatments, even if this was not explicitly stated.

Subsequent treatments include Barneby, Isely, and Welsh.  Each of these treatments are slightly different, containing between 36 and 42 taxa.  Recent molecular work seems to suggest a genetic component to the varieties.

Varieties

Currently the following 40 taxa are recognized:

A. l. var. albifolius M.E.Jones 1923.
A. l. var. ambiguus Barneby 1964.
A. l. var. antonius Barneby 1945.
A. l. var. araneosus (E.Sheld.) Barneby 1945.
A. l. var. australis Barneby 1945.
A. l. var. borreganus M.E.Jones 1898.
A. l. var. chartaceus M.E.Jones 1895.
A. l. var. coachellae Barneby 1964.
A. l. var. diphysus (A.Gray) M.E.Jones 1895.
A. l. var. floribundus Gray 1865.
A. l. var. fremontii (A.Gray 1857) S.Watson 1871.
A. l. var. higginsii S.L.Welsh 1981.
A. l. var. idriensis M.E.Jones 1902.
A. l. var. ineptus (A.Gray) M.E.Jones 1923.
A. l. var. kennedyi (Rydb.) Barneby 1945.
A. l. var. kernensis (Jeps.) Barneby 1945.
A. l. var. latus (M.E.Jones) M.E.Jones 1923.
A. l. var. lentiginosus Barneby 1964.
A. l. var. maricopae Barneby 1945.
A. l. var. micans Barneby 1956.
A. l. var. mokiacensis (A.Gray) M.E.Jones 1923.
A. l. var. multiracemosus S.L.Welsh & N.D.Atwood 2007.
A. l. var. negundo S.L.Welsh & N.D.Atwood 2007.
A. l. var. nigricalycis M.E.Jones 1895.
A. l. var. oropedii Barneby 1945.
A. l. var. palans (M.E.Jones) M.E.Jones 1898.
A. l. var. piscinensis Barneby 1977.
A. l. var. pohlii S.L.Welsh & Barneby 1981.
A. l. var. salinus (Howell) Barneby 1945.
A. l. var. scorpionis M.E.Jones 1923.
A. l. var. semotus Jeps. 1936.
A. l. var. sesquimetralis (Rydb.) Barneby 1945.
A. l. var. sierrae M.E.Jones 1923.
A. l. var. stramineus (Rydb.) Barneby 1945.
A. l. var. trumbullensis S.L.Welsh & N.D.Atwood 1981.
A. l. var. ursinus (A.Gray) Barneby 1945.
A. l. var. variabilis Barneby 1945.
A. l. var. vitreus Barneby 1945.
A. l. var. wilsonii (Greene) Barneby 1945.
A. l. var. yuccanus M.E.Jones 1898.

Conservation
Two rare varieties endemic to California are federally listed under the Endangered Species Act; var. coachellae, or Coachella Valley milk vetch, is endangered and var. piscinensis is threatened.

Cultivation

Astragalus lentiginosus is currently not cultivated commercially.  Propagation from seed requires scarification of the seed coat in order for the embryo to absorb water.

Uses
The Zuni people  eat the pods of the diphysus variety  fresh, boiled, or salted. They are also dried and stored for winter use.

See also
Locoweed

References

External links

Jepson Manual Treatment - Astragalus lentiginosus
USDA Plants Profile: Astragalus lentiginosus
Astragalus lentiginosus Photo gallery
Astragalus lentiginosus - wikispecies treatment
oregonstate.edu: Astragalus lentiginosus website

lentiginosus
Flora of the Western United States
Flora of California
Flora of the Rocky Mountains
Flora of the Sierra Nevada (United States)
Flora of the Great Basin
Flora of the California desert regions
Flora of the Sonoran Deserts
Flora of Riverside County, California
Flora of the Coachella Valley
Plants used in Native American cuisine
Flora without expected TNC conservation status